In 1985, the German Archaeological Institute discovered seal impressions of a cylinder seal in the tomb of First Dynasty king Den.  They were published by Günter Dreyer the following year. The impressions are the earliest confirmed king list for ancient Egypt.

The names are listed in following order:
Narmer
Hor-Aha
Djer
Djet
Den
Merneith (Den's mother and regent)

The list bolsters the argument that Narmer was the founder of the First Dynasty as opposed to being the last of the pre-unification kings of Thinis.  Also of importance is the absence of Menes as scholarly consensus believe Menes was a later variation of Narmer's name.

References

30th-century BC works
1985 archaeological discoveries
Ancient Egyptian King lists
First Dynasty of Egypt
Den (pharaoh)